Michael Abrams (born 27 September 1949 in Battersea, England) is a former English amateur and Commonwealth Games light-flyweight boxer. He fought as Mickey Abrams.

Early career
The following year he became the Junior ABA Southwest and London champion in the class A division, also becoming the national runner up that year.

He did well at the senior ABA competition of 1969/70 at the then "Flyweight" division, before winning the national ABA title for the next 3 years running at Light-Flyweight.

He represented England and won a bronze medal in the light-flyweight category, at the 1970 British Commonwealth Games in Edinburgh, Scotland.

He captained the 1971 Madrid European games, won a Pre-Olympic silver for the 1972 Munich Olympics as well as captaining for the 1973 European games in Belgrade and also the 1974 British Commonwealth Games in Christchurch, New Zealand.

He also had great success in a couple of tours of America, winning 3 fights at the Ohio State fair, Indianapolis and the New Jersey State fair in an ABA tour of 1970, and fought in Madison Square Garden in 1973 in a USA vs the ABA tour. On one of these tours he also met and became good friends with Dustin Hoffman.

Amateur career
Abrams was an amateur boxer for Battersea Amateur Boxing Club, and gained the following ABA titles:
ABA Light-flyweight Champion (48 kg) - 1971
ABA Light-flyweight Champion (48 kg) - 1972
ABA Light-flyweight Champion (48 kg) - 1973

Personal life
Mickey lives in Battersea with his partner Valerie and his young daughter Valentine.  He was a school governor at his daughter's school (Wix Primary), which is the same school that he attended.

References

1949 births
Living people
English male boxers
Commonwealth Games bronze medallists for England
Boxers at the 1970 British Commonwealth Games
Boxers at the 1974 British Commonwealth Games
Light-flyweight boxers
School governors
Boxers from Greater London
Commonwealth Games medallists in boxing
England Boxing champions
Medallists at the 1970 British Commonwealth Games